Trinity Bay State High is a co-educational high school in Manunda, Queensland, Australia. In 2015, it had an enrolment of about 1650 students across year levels 7 to 12. The school draws from the surrounding “three M” suburbs of Cairns (Manoora, Manunda and Mooroobool), in addition to populations in surrounding mortgage belt suburbs. The student population reflects the multicultural nature of the greater city of Cairns and supports just over 100 students in an Intensive English Language program.  Approximately 30% of students identify themselves as being indigenous, the majority of these being Torres Strait Islander.
 
The school's motto was formerly "Endeavour", named after the ship on which Captain Cook sailed into Trinity Bay. This was also the name of an incentive scheme at the school, which encouraged the students to set themselves goals and endeavour to achieve them. The current motto is "Academic, Innovative, Caring."

See also 
 List of schools in Far North Queensland
 Queensland state high schools

References

External links
 Trinity Bay State High School website
 Facebook page

Educational institutions established in 1960
Public high schools in Queensland
Schools in Cairns
1960 establishments in Australia